CSKA Samara is a Russian women's basketball team from Samara, Russia, founded in 2002. CSKA Samara has won Euroleague Women in the 2004–05 season and 3 Russian Championships.

Titles
 1 Euroleague Women (2005)
 3 Russian Championships (2004, 2005, 2006)

See also
 WBC CSKA Moscow

Women's basketball teams in Russia
EuroLeague Women clubs
Basketball teams established in 2002
Sport in Samara, Russia
2002 establishments in Russia